The 1927 Tour de France was the 21st edition of the Tour de France, one of cycling's Grand Tours. The Tour began in Paris with a team time trial on 19 June, and Stage 13 occurred on 4 July with a flat stage from Perpignan. The race finished in Paris on 17 July.

Stage 13
4 July 1927 - Perpignan to Marseille,

Stage 14
5 July 1927 - Marseille to Toulon,  (TTT)

Stage 15
6 July 1927 - Toulon to Nice,

Stage 16
8 July 1927 - Nice to Briançon,

Stage 17
9 July 1927 - Briançon to Evian,

Stage 18
11 July 1927 - Evian to Pontarlier,  (TTT)

Stage 19
12 July 1927 - Pontarlier to Belfort,  (TTT)

Stage 20
13 July 1927 - Belfort to Strasbourg,  (TTT)

Stage 21
14 July 1927 - Strasbourg to Metz,  (TTT)

Stage 22
15 July 1927 - Metz to Charleville,  (TTT)

Stage 23
16 July 1927 - Charleville to Dunkerque,  (TTT)

Stage 24
17 July 1927 - Dunkerque to Paris,

References

1927 Tour de France
Tour de France stages